Detective Lieutenant Vincent D'Agosta is a fictional character appearing in the novels of Douglas Preston and Lincoln Child. He is an Italian New Yorker and a main character in several different storylines.

Fictional character biography
D'Agosta's first appearance is in Relic (1995), as the NYPD detective in charge of investigating the Mbwun museum murders. He and FBI agent Aloysius Pendergast work together to solve the mystery and save innocent lives. D'Agosta returns in Reliquary, after which he retires to Canada, using the pseudonym of Campbell Dirk to write police procedurals.

D'Agosta comes out of retirement, leaving his cheating wife and college aged son (Vinnie Jr.) in Canada, in Brimstone and returns to the force. He is now sergeant in a small town outside New York. He works with Laura Hayward, whom he was romantically involved with, and again with Agent Pendergast. The two investigate various murders with satanic overtones; they also become involved with the search for a priceless violin.

In Dance of Death, D'Agosta risks his job to conceal the fugitive Pendergast's whereabouts and helps him defeat his murderous brother, Diogenes. This takes them back to D'Agosta's old workplace, the museum.

He then helps break Pendergast out of prison and helps to catch Diogenes in The Book of the Dead.

Pendergast later comes to believe his deceased wife was murdered via tampering with her rifle. He hires D'Agosta to assist him in the investigation. An assassin trying to kill Pendergast severely wounds D'Agosta instead. Another effort is made to kill D'Agosta, partly to entrap Pendergast as well. The attempt fails on both counts. This takes place in the novel Fever Dream.

Adaptation 

In the 1997 film The Relic, Lieutenant D'Agosta is played by Tom Sizemore.

External links 
 Vicent D'Agosta on IMDb

Characters in American novels of the 20th century
Fictional New York City Police Department detectives
Fictional Chicago Police Department detectives
Fictional Italian American people
Male horror film characters
Literary characters introduced in 1995